The 303rd Fighter Wing is an inactive United States Air Force unit. Its last assignment was with the XXIX Tactical Air Command. It was disbanded on 12 August 1945.

History
Established and organized at Norfolk Army Airfield, Virginia in 1943 as a command and control organization.   Deployed to the European Theater of Operations (ETO) in late 1943 and assigned to IX Fighter Command, Ninth Air Force.  Initial mission of the wing was to receive operational orders from Headquarters, IX Fighter Command and direct subordinate groups in attacking enemy targets in Occupied France and the Low Countries in preparation for the Normandy Invasion in June 1944.

Operational missions included strafing and dive-bombing armored vehicles, trains, bridges, buildings, factories, troop concentrations, gun emplacements, airfields, and other targets in preparation for the invasion of Normandy. Also flew some escort missions with Eighth Air Force Boeing B-17 Flying Fortress and Consolidated B-24 Liberator strategic bombers.

Participated in the June 1944 D-Day invasion of France in by patrolling the air over the landing zones and by flying close-support and interdiction missions. Operations supported the breakthrough at Saint-Lô in July and the thrust of The United States Third Army toward Germany in August and September.  Reassigned to XIX Tactical Air Command in November 1944 and continued supporting Third Army with Air-Ground support missions, moving through Nancy and Metz to the Siegfried Line near Saarbrücken and Haguenau.

Reassigned to support the United States Ninth Army in Belgium as a result of the German offensive during the Battle of the Bulge, December 1944.  Attacked enemy targets in the Northern Rheinland during the Rhineland Campaign and Operation Grenade, which was the southern prong of a pincer attack coordinated with Canadian First Army's Operation Veritable, with the purpose of closing the front up to the Rhine River. By 10 March, the Rhine had been reached in all sectors of Ninth Army's front. It was not until after 20 March that Ninth Army units first crossed the Rhine itself.

Attacked ground targets in the Ruhr, providing air support as Allied ground forces encircled enemy forces in the Ruhr Pocket, essentially ending organized enemy resistance in Western Germany.   Ninth Army halted its advance at the Elbe River in late April 1945, the wing engaging targets of opportunity in enemy-controlled areas until combat was ended on 5 May 1945.

Remained in Europe after the war as part of United States Air Forces in Europe, performing occupation duty and the destruction or shipment to the United States of captured enemy combat equipment.  Demobilized in Germany and organization was inactivated on 20 November 1945.

Operations and decorations
 Combat Operations:  Combat in European Theater of Operations (ETO), 8 March 1944-May 1945.
 Campaigns: Air Offensive, Europe ;Normandy; Northern France; Rhineland; Ardennes-Alsace; Central Europe
 Decorations: Cited in the Order of the Day, Belgian Army: 1 Oct 1944-; Dec 1944-Jan 1945. Belgian Fourragere

Lineage
 Constituted as 303rd Fighter Wing on 15 Nov 1943
 Activated on 24 Nov 1943
 Disbanded on 12 August 1945

Assignments
 First Air Force, 24 November 1943 – 8 March 1944
 IX Fighter Command, 8 March-1 November 1944
 XIX Tactical Air Command, 1 November 1944 – 15 December 1944
 XXIX Tactical Air Command, 15 December 1944 – 20 November 1945

Components

 36th Fighter Group: (P-47 Thunderbolt), 4 April-1 August 1944
 373rd Fighter Group: (P-47 Thunderbolt), 4 April 1944 – 4 August 1945
 Attached to: XIX Tactical Air Command, entire period
 405th Fighter Group: (P-47 Thunderbolt), 1 August-1 October 1944
 Attached to: XIX Tactical Air Command, entire period

 406th Fighter Group: (P-47 Thunderbolt), 1 August-1 October 1944
 Attached to: XIX Tactical Air Command, entire period

Stations

 Norfolk AAF, Virginia, 24 November 1943 – 12 February 1944
 RAF Ashford (AAF-417), England, 8 March 1944
 La Combe, France, 31 July 1944
 Houesville, France, 2 August 1944
 Rennes Airfield (A-27), France, 24 August 1944
 Vermand, France, 17 September 1944

 Arlon, Belgium, C. 3 October 1944
 Maastricht Airfield (Y-44), Netherlands, 22 October 1944
 Munchen-Gladbach Airfield (Y-56), Germany, 8 March 1945
 Haltern, Germany, 3 April 1945
 Gutersloh Airfield (Y-99), Germany, 14 April 1945
 Brunswick/Broitzem Airfield (R-38), Germany, 22 April – 20 November 1945

References

 Maurer, Maurer (1983). Air Force Combat Units of World War II. Maxwell AFB, Alabama: Office of Air Force History. 
 Johnson, David C. (1988), U.S. Army Air Forces Continental Airfields (ETO), D-Day to V-E Day; Research Division, USAF Historical Research Center, Maxwell AFB, Alabama.

Military units and formations established in 1943
Fighter wings of the United States Army Air Forces